Rose Veronica Coyle (July 30, 1914 – February 24, 1988) was Miss America 1936.

Early life
Coyle was the eldest child born to John Joseph Coyle, Jr. and Isabel (née Trainer) Coyle.

Pageantry
Coyle was the first to receive an encore in the talent completion at a Miss America pageant; she sang "I Can't Escape from You," and she performed an eight-minute long tap dance.

Personal life
In 1938 she married Leonard Schlessinger, the National General Manager of the Warner Bros. Theatres and had one daughter, Diane.

Widowed, she married executive Robert Dingler and lived a quiet life until her death in 1988.

References 

1914 births
1988 deaths
Miss America 1930s delegates
Miss America winners
Miss America Preliminary Talent winners
People from Yeadon, Pennsylvania